Clemens Crabeels (c.1534–1592) was the third bishop of 's-Hertogenbosch, in the Habsburg Netherlands, from 1584 until his death in 1592.

Life
Crabeels was born in Leuven around 1534 and studied at the University of Leuven, graduating Licentiate of Laws. In 1557 he was appointed to a canonry of the collegiate church of St Bavo, in Ghent, which in 1559 was elevated to the status of cathedral. In 1575, at the death of the first bishop of Ghent, he was elected vicar general of the diocese, but was driven from the city by the Calvinist coup of 1578. On 3 September 1584 he was appointed bishop of 's-Hertogenbosch, and was consecrated in Tournai on 6 January 1585. He died in 's-Hertogenbosch on 22 October 1592 and was buried in the choir of his cathedral.

References

1592 deaths
Belgian bishops
16th-century Roman Catholic bishops in the Holy Roman Empire
Old University of Leuven alumni
Year of birth uncertain